Le Colonel Chabert (English title: Colonel Chabert) is a 1994 French historical drama film directed by Yves Angelo and starring Gérard Depardieu, Fanny Ardant and Fabrice Luchini. It is based on the novel Le Colonel Chabert by Honoré de Balzac. Another film adaptation of the novel starring Raimu had been released 50 years earlier, during the German occupation of France.

Synopsis 
In Paris, in February 1817, three years after the fall of the Empire, the lawyer Derville receives a visit from a shabbily dressed man. He claims to be Colonel Chabert, believed dead at the Battle of Eylau in 1807. He had contributed to the victory by leading a famous cavalry charge against the Russians.

The man tells how, waking in a mass grave surrounded by corpses, he survived his wounds.

He has returned ten years later and wishes to claim his title, to assert his rights and to live again with his wife, who has greatly increased the fortune she inherited from him. She, during his absence, has married Count Ferraud and had children.

She refuses to recognise her first husband. Derville agrees to help the colonel by proposing a settlement in which she will make a large settlement on Chabert if he agrees to divorce her and give up his claims. She refuses the proposed terms and tries to manipulate her ex-husband, asking him to declare his claim is fraudulent. Chabert, disgusted by her deceitfulness and the idea of him renouncing his name, abandons his claim.

Colonel Chabert finishes his life penniless and in an asylum, reminiscing on his last battle.

Cast 
 Gérard Depardieu : Amédé Chabert
 Fabrice Luchini : Maître Derville
 Fanny Ardant : Countess Ferraud
 André Dussollier : Count Ferraud
 Daniel Prévost : Boucard
 Olivier Saladin : Huré
 Maxime Leroux : Godeschal
 Éric Elmosnino : Maître Desroches
 Guillaume Romain : Simonin
 Patrick Bordier : Boutin
 Claude Rich : Chamblin
 Jean Cosmos : Costaz
 Jacky Nercessian : Delbecq
 Albert Delpy : Maître Roguin
 Romane Bohringer : Sophie
 Valérie Bettencourt : Julie
 Julie Depardieu : A maid

Production 
 Direction : Yves Angelo, assisted by Frédéric Blum
 Script : Yves Angelo, Jean Cosmos and Véronique Lagrange, from the novel by Honoré de Balzac
 Production : Jean-Louis Livi and Bernard Marescot
 Music : Régis Pasquier
 Photography : Bernard Lutic
 Editing : Thierry Derocles
 Scenery : Bernard Vézat (certain interior scenes filmed at Château de Bizy in Vernon, Eure)
 Costumes : Franca Squarciapino

Awards and nominations
Cairo Film Festival (Egypt)
Won: Golden Pyramid (Yves Angelo)
César Awards (France)
Nominated: Best Actor – Leading Role (Gérard Depardieu) 
Nominated: Best Actor – Supporting Role (Fabrice Luchini)
Nominated: Best Cinematography (Bernard Lutic) 
Nominated: Best Costume Design (Franca Squarciapino) 
Nominated: Best First Work (Yves Angelo) 
Nominated: Best Production Design (Bernard Vézat)

References

External links

French war films
French historical films
1990s war films
1990s historical films
Napoleonic Wars films
Films set in 1817
Films based on works by Honoré de Balzac
Films based on French novels
Films directed by Yves Angelo
1990s French-language films
1990s French films